A spill occurs when the contents of something, usually in liquid form, are emptied out onto a surface, person or clothes, often unintentionally.

Spill may also refer to:

Oil spill
Chemical spill
Data spill
Leadership spill
Spill (audio), where audio from one source is picked up by a microphone intended for a different source
Variable spilling, a side effect of register allocation
Thin sticks of wood or tightly rolled paper tapers, used for transferring fire, and stored in a spill vase
SPILL – an acronym for St Pancras International Low Level, the Thameslink platforms at St Pancras railway station in London

As a proper name
Thomas Spilsbury, soccer player nicknamed Spill
Spill (band), a British dance duo
Spill.com, a movie review website

People with the surname
Daniel Spill (1832–1887), English entrepreneur
Steve Spill (born 1955), American magician

Literature
Spill. En damroman, a 2010 Swedish novel by Sigrid Combüchen
Spill: Scenes of Black Feminist Fugitivity, a 2017 book of prose and poetry by Alexis Pauline Gumbs.

See also
Spilling water for luck
Spilling salt